Yuya Aoki may refer to:
 Yuya Aoki, pen-name used by Japanese writer Shin Kibayashi
 Yuya Aoki (wrestler) (born 1996), Japanese professional wrestler